The President James K. Polk Historic Site is a museum and historic location in Mecklenburg County, North Carolina, and a historic site managed by the North Carolina Department of Natural and Cultural Resources' Historic Sites division.  The property was the location of property owned by the parents of President James K. Polk, and exhibits at the historic site serve to tell the story of the President's political career, as well as provide a look into life in North Carolina in the early 19th century.

See also
 Presidential memorials in the United States

References

External links

 North Carolina State Historic Sites page

Museums in Mecklenburg County, North Carolina
History museums in North Carolina
North Carolina State Historic Sites
Protected areas of Mecklenburg County, North Carolina
James K. Polk
Presidential museums in the United States
Biographical museums in North Carolina
Houses in Mecklenburg County, North Carolina